, commonly known as Toshi, is a Japanese professional footballer who plays as forward for Brazilian club Friburguense on loan from Portuguesa.

External links
Toshi at Avai.com.br
Toshiya Tojo at FootballDatabase.eu

Toshiya Tojo at ZeroZero

1992 births
Living people
Japanese footballers
Association football forwards
Campeonato Brasileiro Série B players
Campeonato Brasileiro Série D players
Friburguense Atlético Clube players
Avaí FC players
Esporte Clube Internacional de Lages players
Associação Portuguesa de Desportos players
Japanese expatriate footballers
Japanese expatriate sportspeople in Brazil
Expatriate footballers in Brazil